Numerous plug-in electric vehicle (EV) fire incidents have taken place since the introduction of mass-production plug-in electric vehicles. As a result of these incidents, the United States Department of Transportation's National Highway Traffic Safety Administration (NHTSA) conducted a study in 2017 to establish whether lithium-ion batteries in plug-electric vehicles pose an exceptional fire hazard. The research looked at whether the high-voltage batteries can cause fires when they are being charged, and when the vehicles are involved in an accident. Regarding the risk of electrochemical failure, [this] report concludes that the propensity and severity of fires and explosions from the accidental ignition of flammable electrolytic solvents used in Li-ion battery systems are anticipated to be somewhat comparable to or perhaps slightly less than those for gasoline or diesel vehicular fuels. The overall consequences for Li-ion batteries are expected to be less because of the much smaller amounts of flammable solvent released and burning in a catastrophic failure situation.

The NHTSA in 2021 opened a new Battery Safety Initiative investigation into ev car fires in light of the continuing numerous fire incidents.

They were thermal runaway incidents related to the lithium-ion batteries. The brands involved were the Zotye M300 EV, Chevrolet Volt, Fisker Karma, Dodge Ram 1500 Plug-in Hybrid, Toyota Prius Plug-in Hybrid, Mitsubishi i-MiEV and Outlander P-HEV.

, four fires after an impact have been reported associated with the batteries of plug-in electric cars. The first crash related fire was reported in China in May 2012, after a high-speed car crashed into a BYD e6 taxi in Shenzhen. Two incidents occurred with the Tesla Model S in October 2013, one when a Model S caught fire after the electric car hit metal debris on a highway in Kent, Washington, and another involving a loss of control and collision with a tree in Merida, Mexico. A Tesla Model S being driven on a highway near Murfreesboro, Tennessee caught fire in November 2013 after it struck a tow hitch on the roadway, causing damage beneath the vehicle.

A Mitsubishi Outlander fire in May 2019 appeared to be related to immersion in salt water (which is electrically conductive), probably for an hour or two.

General Motors, Nissan and Tesla have published a guide for firefighters, and first responders to properly handle a crashed electric-drive vehicle and safely disable its battery and other high voltage systems.

The difference with EV car fires is the use of high voltage lithium-ion batteries which can short and break down and spontaneously combust, and also that lithium-ion fires are difficult to extinguish and produce toxic smoke.

Background

Frequency of vehicle fires
Fire incidents in highway capable vehicles occur relatively frequently.  A study of U.S. fires from 20032007 finds that fire departments respond to an average of 287,000 vehicle fires per year, or 30 vehicle fires per hour, and that vehicles were involved in 17% of all reported U.S. fires. The study also finds that roughly 53 highway vehicle fires and 0.15 highway vehicle fire deaths were reported per billion miles driven.

Thermal runaway
Lithium-ion batteries may suffer thermal runaway and cell rupture if overheated or overcharged, and in extreme cases this can lead to combustion. To reduce these risks, lithium-ion battery packs contain fail-safe circuitry that shuts down the battery when its voltage is outside the safe range. When handled improperly, or if manufactured defectively, some rechargeable batteries can experience thermal runaway resulting in overheating. Sealed cells will sometimes explode violently if safety vents are overwhelmed or nonfunctional. Reports of exploding cellphones have been published in newspapers. In 2006, batteries from Apple, HP, Toshiba, Lenovo, Dell and other notebook manufacturers were recalled because of fire and explosions.

Safety guidelines for fire hazard
In the United States, General Motors ran, in several cities, a training program for firefighters and first responders to demonstrate the sequence of tasks required to safely disable the Chevrolet Volt's powertrain and its 12 volt electrical system, which controls its high-voltage components, and then proceed to extricate injured occupants. The Volt's high-voltage system is designed to shut down automatically in the event of an airbag deployment, and to detect a loss of communication from an airbag control module. GM also made available an Emergency Response Guide for the 2011 Volt for use by emergency responders. The guide also describes methods of disabling the high voltage system and identifies cut zone information. Nissan also published a guide for first responders that details procedures for handling a damaged 2011 Leaf at the scene of an accident, including a manual high-voltage system shutdown, rather than the automatic process built-in the car's safety systems.

NHTSA research of fire risk
In August 2012, the National Highway Traffic Safety Administration (NHTSA) decided to begin a  million study of whether lithium-ion batteries in plug-electric vehicles pose a potential fire hazard. The research looked at whether the high-voltage batteries can cause fires when they are being charged and when the vehicles are involved in an accident. The research from 2013 was initiated to evaluate the fire risk 400-volt lithium ion batteries pose. General Motors assisted the NHTSA researchers, and the study was issued in October 2017. The report concluded, "...ignition of flammable electrolytic solvents used in Li-ion battery systems are anticipated to be somewhat comparable to or perhaps slightly less than those for gasoline or diesel vehicular fuels. The overall consequences for Li-ion batteries are expected to be less because of the much smaller amounts of flammable solvent released and burning in a catastrophic failure situation."(p. 11-2)

On October 24, 2019, the National Highway Traffic Safety Administration opened a Defect Petition for Tesla Model S and X vehicles manufactured between 2012 and 2019 related to battery fires not caused by collision or impact.

Responding to 2022 questions about the risk of fire and reignition related to contact of li-ion battery with salt water (seawater), as it appeared to happen in Florida following the passage of Hurricane Ian, Jack Danielson (executive director of NHTSA) wrote that what reported "is not an isolated event". He also quote tests and studies dated 2019 and 2021 on the subject.

Emerging risks around home charging and the ability to detect and extinghuish a fire in a domestic setting are not well understood.

Electric vehicle incidents

A Future EV 
About 6 a.m. on 17 November 2010 a fire broke out on the vehicle deck of the MS Pearl of Scandinavia on its way from Oslo to Copenhagen. The ferry's fire sprinkler system put out the fire before any of the crew or the 490 sleeping passengers were injured and the ship could dock in Copenhagen under its own power. It was determined that the cause of the fire was a short circuit in the plug of an extension cord used to charge a rebuilt Nissan Qashqai, converted into a battery electric vehicle by the Sakskøbing based company A Future EV. The company owner was returning from Norway where the vehicle had started the approval process for general sale there, and had used an extension cord to charge the vehicle from a general purpose power outlet on the ferry. The ferry operator DFDS Seaways consequently prohibited vehicle charging on board its ferries while the investors withdrew their support for the vehicle company forcing it into bankruptcy.

Zotye M300 EV 
A Zotye M300 EV operating as a taxicab caught fire in Hangzhou, China, in April 2011. No one was injured as the driver and two passengers evacuated the electric car in time. Due to the incident, the city authorities decided to halt all electric taxis on safety concerns, 15 of which were M300 EVs out of a fleet of 30 electric taxis. The city's official investigation team found the cause of the fire was the car's defective battery pack due to lack of quality control during manufacturing. According to the investigation report, the battery pack problems include: leaking of battery cells; damage of the insulation between battery cells and the walls of the aluminum container in which the cells were stacked; short circuits occurred within certain containers and those involving supporting and connecting parts. One of the stronger short circuits ignited the car's back seats.  The lead investigators said that "...in sealing and packing the battery cells, in loading and unloading the battery stacks, insufficient attention had been paid to several safety factors; monitoring procedures had been inefficient or neglected in the process of manufacturing, battery charging/switching, and vehicle driving, failing to detect anomalies." The report added that the battery cells on the car were made by Zhejiang Wanxiang Group.

Chevrolet Bolt
As of August 2021, Electrek had compiled a list of 18 battery-related Chevrolet Bolt fires, and one possible-battery related fire. The frequent fires resulted in a recall of about 110,000 Chevrolet Bolt and Bolt EUV EVs from the 2017 through 2022 model years.

Even after the recall, several fires occurred in vehicles that had received the new software and been checked by a dealer — including one in a vehicle owned by a Vermont state lawmaker. Another fire happened in New Jersey, the company told CNBC. GM says it's still investigating the fires, and is asking owners who haven't gotten the fix to take their Bolts in to a dealer regardless. At least nine fires have been documented, and the company has started buying back some Bolts. Moreover, the company recommended that Bolt owners park their cars outside and at least 50 feet away from other vehicles.

On September 13, 2021, a Chevrolet Bolt caught fire in a private garage in Cherokee County, Georgia, USA. The owner had either been unaware or simply ignored the recommendation to park outside.

Chevrolet Volt
As a result of a crash-tested Chevrolet Volt that caught fire in June 2011 three weeks after the testing, the National Highway Traffic Safety Administration (NHTSA) issued a statement saying that the agency does not believe the Volt or other electric vehicles are at a greater risk of fire than gasoline-powered vehicles. They added: "In fact, all vehicles –both electric and gasoline-powered – have some risk of fire in the event of a serious crash." The NHTSA announced in November 2011 that it was working with all automakers to develop post-crash procedures to keep occupants of electric vehicles and emergency personnel who respond to crash scenes safe.

In further testing of the Volt's batteries carried out by NHTSA in November 2011, two of the three tests resulted in thermal events, including fire. Therefore, the NHTSA opened a formal safety defect investigation on November 25, 2011, to examine the potential risks involved from intrusion damage to the battery in the Chevrolet Volt.

On January 5, 2012, General Motors announced that it would offer a customer satisfaction program to provide modifications to the Chevrolet Volt to reduce the chance that the battery pack could catch fire days or weeks after a severe accident. General Motors explained the modifications will enhance the vehicle structure that surround the battery and the battery coolant system to improve battery protection after a severe crash. The safety enhancements consist of strengthening an existing portion of the Volt's vehicle safety structure to further protect the battery pack in a severe side collision; add a sensor in the reservoir of the battery coolant system to monitor coolant levels; and add a tamper-resistant bracket to the top of the battery coolant reservoir to help prevent potential coolant overfill. On January 20, 2012, the NHTSA closed the Volt's safety defect investigation related to post-crash fire risk. The agency concluded that "no discernible defect trend exists" and also found that the modifications recently developed by General Motors are sufficient to reduce the potential for battery intrusion resulting from side impacts. The NHTSA also said that "based on the available data, NHTSA does not believe that Chevy Volts or other electric vehicles pose a greater risk of fire than gasoline-powered vehicles."  The agency also announced it has developed interim guidance to increase awareness and identify appropriate safety measures regarding electric vehicles for the emergency response community, law enforcement officers, tow truck operators, storage facilities and consumers.

Fisker Karma

In December 2011, Fisker Automotive recalled the first 239 Karmas delivered to the U.S. due to a risk of battery fire caused by coolant leak. Of the 239 cars, less than fifty had been delivered to customers, the rest were in dealerships. In the report filed by Fisker Automotive with the NHTSA, the carmaker said some hose clamps were not properly positioned, which could allow a coolant leak and an electrical short could possibly occur if coolant enters the battery compartment, causing a thermal event within the battery, including a possible fire. In May 2012 a Fisker Karma was involved in a home fire that also burnt two other cars in Fort Bend County, Texas. The chief fire investigator said the Karma was the origin of the fire that spread to the house, but the exact cause is still unknown. The plug-in hybrid electric car was not plugged in at the time the fire started and it was reported that the Karma's battery was intact. The carmaker release a public statement saying that "...there are conflicting reports and uncertainty surrounding this particular incident. The cause of the fire is not yet known and is being investigated." Fisker Automotive also stated that the battery pack "does not appear to have been a contributing factor in this incident."  The NHTSA is conducting a field inquiry of the incident, and is working with insurance adjusters and Fisker to determine the fire's cause.

A second fire incident took place in August 2012 when a Karma caught fire while stopped at a parking lot in Woodside, California. According to Fisker engineers, the area of origin for the fire was determined to be outside the engine compartment, as the fire was located at the driver's side front corner of the car. The evidence suggested that the ignition source was not the lithium-ion battery pack, new technology components or unique exhaust routing. The investigation conducted by Fisker engineers and an independent fire expert concluded that the cause of the fire was a low temperature cooling fan located at the left front of the Karma, forward of the wheel. An internal fault caused the fan to fail, overheat and started a slow-burning fire. Fisker announced a voluntary recall on all Karmas sold to replace the faulty fan and install an additional fuse.

BYD e6

In May 2012, after a Nissan GT-R crashed into a BYD e6 taxi in Shenzhen, China, the electric car caught fire after hitting a tree killing all three occupants. The Chinese investigative team concluded that the cause of the fire was that "electric arcs caused by the short-circuiting of high voltage lines of the high voltage distribution box ignited combustible material in the vehicle including the interior materials and part of the power batteries." The team also noted that the battery pack did not explode; 75% of the single cell batteries did not catch fire; and no flaws in the safety design of the vehicle were identified.

On December 29, 2020, a BYD e6 taxi caught fire at an intersection in Luohu District, Shenzhen, China.

BYD Han EV 
In July 2021, Dongchedi, a ByteDance's automotive media in China, performed a crash test of BYD Han EV versus Arcfox Alpha-S. Having been parked for 48 hours after the test, only the Han EV caught fire and burned to the ground.

On June 15, 2022, a BYD Han EV caught fire on a road in Xaysetha district, Vientiane, Laos.

BYD Tang 
On November 15, 2021, a BYD Tang EV caught fire in a workshop in Kristiansand, Norway.

On January 26, 2022, a BYD Tang DM-i (plug-in hybrid) caught fire on a flatbed tow truck, on a road in mainland China. By the such kind of transporting, it seems to be a malfunctioning car.

BYD Qin 
On May 28, 2020, a BYD Qin Pro EV caught fire at a charging station in Shenzhen, China.

On October 28, 2020, a BYD Qin Pro EV caught fire after charging completed in Yantai, Shandong province, China.

On November 22, 2021, a BYD Qin Pro EV caught fire in an underground parking lot in Beijing, China.

On February 13, 2022, a BYD Qin Plus DM-i (plug-in hybrid) caught fire on a road in Zhongshan city, Guangdong province, China.

Dodge Ram 1500 Plug-in Hybrid

In September 2012 Chrysler temporarily suspended a demonstration program that was conducting with 109 Dodge Ram 1500 Plug-in Hybrids and 23 Chrysler Town & Country plug-in hybrids. All units deployed in the program were recalled due to damage sustained by three separate pickup trucks when their 12.9 kWh battery packs overheated. The carmaker plans to upgrade the battery packs with cells that use a different lithium-ion chemistry before the vehicles go back on service. Chrysler explained that no one was injured from any of the incidents, and the vehicles were not occupied at the time, nor any of the minivans were involved in any incident, but they were withdrawn as a precaution. The carmaker reported that the demonstration fleet had collectively accumulated 1.3 million miles (2.1 million km) before the vehicles were recalled. The demonstration is a program jointly funded by Chrysler and the U.S. Department of Energy that includes the first-ever factory-produced vehicles capable of reverse power flow. The experimental system would allow fleet operators to use their plug-in hybrids to supply electricity for a building during a power outage, reduce power usage when electric rates are high or even sell electricity back to their utility company.

Fires related to Hurricane Sandy flood
In separate incidents during the storm and flooding caused by Hurricane Sandy on the night of October 29, 2012, one Toyota Prius Plug-in Hybrid and 16 Fisker Karmas caught fire while being parked at Port Newark-Elizabeth Marine Terminal. The vehicles were partially submerged by flash floods caused by the hurricane. In the case of the Toyota's incident, a Prius PHV burned and two other Priuses, a conventional hybrid and a plug-in, just smoldered. A Toyota spokeswoman said the fire "likely started because saltwater got into the electrical system." She also clarified that the incident affected only three cars out of the 4,000 Toyotas that were at the terminal during the storm, including more than 2,128 plug-in or hybrid models. Fisker Automotive spokesman said that the Karmas were not charging at the time of the fire and there were no injuries. After an investigation by Fisker engineers, witnessed by NHTSA representatives, the company said that the origin of the fire was "residual salt damage inside a Vehicle Control Unit submerged in seawater for several hours. Corrosion from the salt caused a short circuit in the unit, which led to a fire when the Karma's 12-Volt battery fed power into the circuit." The company explained that Sandy's heavy winds spread that fire to other Karmas parked nearby, and also ruled out the vehicles' lithium-ion battery packs as a cause of, or a contributing factor to, the fire.

Mitsubishi i-MiEV and Outlander P-HEV

In March 2013 Mitsubishi Motors reported two separate incidents with lithium-ion batteries used in its plug-in electric cars, one with a Mitsubishi i-MiEV electric car and the other with an Outlander P-HEV plug-in hybrid. The battery packs are produced by GS Yuasa, the same company that supplies the batteries for the Boeing 787 Dreamliner, whose entire fleet was grounded in January 2013 for battery problems. The lithium-ion battery of an i-MiEV caught fire at the Mizushima battery pack assembly plant on March 18 while connected to a charge-discharge test equipment. Three days later, the battery pack of an Outlander P-HEV at a dealership in Yokohama overheated and melted some of the battery cells, after the vehicle had been fully charged and stood for one day. Nobody was injured in either incident.

Mitsubishi did not issue a recall but halted production and sales of the two models until it determines the causes of the battery problems. The carmaker advised owners of the Outlander plug-in hybrid to drive only on gasoline mode for the time being. In the case of the i-MiEV, the problem is related with a change in GS Yuasa manufacturing process, and Mitsubishi called fleet-vehicle operators with i-MiEVs whose batteries were made under the same process as those that overheated and is working on a possible fix. In August 2013, and after changing a production process to avoid damaging any batteries, Mitsubishi restarted production of the Outlander plug-in hybrid.

In May 2019 an Outlander caught fire after immersion in salt water. The vehicle was being used to haul a boat trailer out of the water at a Port Moody boat ramp when the driver lost control. After a tow truck recovered the Outlander, what appears to be the battery pack caught fire.

Tesla Model S, 3, X, and Y 

Although the frequency of fires in a Tesla is about an order of magnitude below fires in gasoline cars, there are 44 known cases of deaths involving incidents of Tesla car fires. The following list of Tesla car fires is not comprehensive:

A Tesla Model S caught fire after the vehicle hit debris on a highway in Kent, Washington, on October 1, 2013. According to the driver, he hit something while traveling in the HOV lane of Washington State Route 167, and exited because the car reported a problem and told him to stop. Flames began coming out of the front of the car at the end of the off-ramp, so the driver left the car. The fire was caught on video by a witness and posted on several websites.  According to the Kent Fire Department incident report, initial attempts to extinguish the fire with water were unsuccessful, as the fire reignited underneath the vehicle after appearing to be extinguished. Then, the firefighters cut a hole to apply water directly to the burning battery. According to Tesla, the car owner was alerted by onboard systems to stop the car and exit the vehicle, which he did without injury.

The carmaker confirmed the fire began in the battery pack and it was caused by an impact to one of the battery pack modules by a large piece of metal from a semi-trailer and that the design of the battery pack had isolated the fire to the front section's internal firewalls.

The company also said that conventional gasoline-powered cars were much more vulnerable to such a situation, because they have less underbody protection. It also noted that the battery pack holds only about 10% of the energy contained in a gasoline tank and is spread across 16 firewalled modules, meaning that the combustion potential is only about 1% as much. Elon Musk posted on his blog that, based on U.S. automobile miles-per-fire statistics from the National Fire Protection Association, a driver is "5 times more likely to experience a fire in a conventional gasoline car than a Tesla." The stock recovered by 4.4% at the closing of the week.

Tesla's CEO, Elon Musk, issued an official statement on October 4, 2013. The statement said that a curved piece of metal from a semi-trailer that had fallen on the roadway appeared to have impaled the  plate on the base of the vehicle. After the driver exited the car, the statement continued, the frontmost of the car's 16 battery modules caught fire due to the initial damage, but the battery pack's internal firewalls kept the fire from spreading and vents directed the flames away from the car down towards the pavement. The statement also noted that the fire never entered the passenger compartment. According to Tesla, the firefighters observed standard procedure, and gained access to the source of the fire by puncturing holes in the top of the battery's protective metal plate and applying water. However, the company noted that although the water and dry-chemical fire extinguisher quickly put out the fire, the firefighters should not have punctured the firewall since the new holes allowed flames to enter the front trunk of the vehicle. Musk closed the official statement explaining that the result of this accident could have been "far worse" had a conventional gasoline-powered car encountered the same object on the highway, because most gasoline cars do not have an armored underbody, leaving the fuel lines and tank vulnerable. He also noted that Tesla's battery pack only contains about 10% as much energy as a standard tank of gasoline and it is divided into 16 sections means that the combustion potential is about 1% of a comparable gasoline-powered car. Based on U.S. statistics from the National Fire Protection Association, Musk's statement claimed that a fire was five times more likely in a gasoline car than in a Tesla car.

The U.S. National Highway Traffic Safety Administration (NHTSA) was not able to send investigators to the scene of the incident due to the U.S federal government shutdown. After the agency reopened, the NHTSA began gathering data of the incident. On 24 October 2013, the agency announced it will not open a formal investigation into the Model S fire incident, saying that they had not found evidence that the fire was caused by a vehicle defect or noncompliance.

A second reported fire occurred on October 18, 2013, in Merida, Mexico. In this case the vehicle was being driven at high speed through a roundabout and crashed through a wall and into a tree. The NHTSA did not investigate this incident because it occurred outside the U.S.  There have since been several additional fires, caused by catastrophic high speed collisions, which are omitted from this list because they do not illustrate problems unique to electric drive trains. (Incidents which illustrate issues with Tesla's Autopilot features, including some that lead to car fires, are listed here)

A Tesla Model S being driven on Interstate 24 near Murfreesboro, Tennessee caught fire on November 6, 2013, after it struck a tow hitch on the roadway, causing damage beneath the vehicle. Tesla Motors stated that it would conduct its own investigation, and as a result of these incidents, the company announced its decision to extend its current vehicle warranty to cover fire damage and to apply a software update on Model S cars to increase the ground clearance of the Model S when driving at highway speed.

On November 19, 2013, based on the two fire incidents occurring on U.S. public highways, the NHTSA opened a preliminary evaluation to determine if undercarriage strikes presented an undue fire risk on the 2013 Tesla Model S. An estimated population of 13,108 Model S cars were part of this initial investigation.

On November 15, 2013, a fire broke out in an Irvine, California garage where a Tesla Model S was plugged in and charging. The fire appears to have originated at the wall connection where the Tesla charging equipment was plugged in. Shortly afterwards, Tesla updated the Model S firmware to reduce charging current when power fluctuations were detected and replaced wall adapters with a new unit containing a thermal fuse.

On November 18, 2013, Tesla released a software update to the air suspension system to increase the ground clearance at highway speeds and requested that the NHTSA conduct an investigation into the fire incidents. Another fire incident took place in Toronto, Canada, in early February 2014. The Model S was parked in a garage and it was not plugged in or charging when the fire started. , the origin of the fire was still unknown. Tesla's response was that "[i]n this particular case, we don't yet know the precise cause, but have definitively determined that it did not originate in the battery, the charging system, the adapter or the electrical receptacle, as these components were untouched by the fire."

On March 28, 2014, the NHTSA announced that it had closed the investigation into whether the Model S design was making the electric car prone to catch fire, after the automaker said it would provide more protection to its lithium-ion batteries. According to the NHTSA, the titanium underbody shield and aluminum deflector plates, along with increased ground clearance, reduce the severity, frequency, and fire risk of underbody strikes. All Model S cars manufactured after March 6 have the  aluminum shield over the battery pack replaced with a new three-layer shield designed to protect the battery and charging circuitry from being punctured even in very high speed impacts. The new shielding features a hollow aluminum tube to deflect impacting objects, a titanium shield to protect sensitive components from puncture damage, and an aluminum extrusion to absorb impact energy. The new shields, which decrease vehicle range by 0.1%, will be installed free-of-charge in existing Model S vehicles by request or during the next scheduled maintenance. According to the NHTSA, the titanium underbody shield and aluminum deflector plates, along with increased ground clearance, "should reduce both the frequency of underbody strikes and the resultant fire risk."

A fire occurred in a Tesla Model S charging at a Tesla Supercharger in Norway on January 1, 2016. The fire was slow, and the owner had time to unplug the car and retrieve possessions. An investigation by the Norwegian Accident Investigation Board (AIBN) indicated that the fire originated in the car, but was otherwise inconclusive. In March 2016, Tesla stated that their own investigation into the incident concluded that the fire was caused by a short circuit in the vehicle's distribution box, but that the amount of damage prevented them from determining the exact cause. Tesla stated that the Supercharger detected the short circuit and deactivated, and a future Model S software update would stop the vehicle from charging if a short circuit is detected.

On August 15, 2016, a new Tesla Model S 90D spontaneously caught fire during a promotional test drive in Biarritz, France. Following a sudden, loud noise the dashboard presented the driver with a warning of a "charging" problem. Following advice from a passenger Tesla employee, the driver pulled over and all three occupants safely exited the vehicle. Moments later the vehicle started burning and although firefighters quickly arrived, the fire completely destroyed the vehicle within 5 minutes. Tesla subsequently determined that the vehicle in question had a "bolted electrical connection" which would normally have been tightened by a robot, but which in this case had been "improperly tightened" by a human, causing the fire.

On August 25, 2017, the driver of a Model X lost control of the vehicle, which went over an embankment and struck a garage in Lake Forest, California, starting a fire that damaged the car and structure. The NTSB stated the resulting battery fire was under investigation.

On May 8, 2018, an 18-year-old lost control of his Tesla Model S while driving 116 mph in a 30 mph zone and hit the curb, a wall, the curb and a light pole causing the battery pack to ignite; the car was reportedly modified to be limited to a top speed of 85 mph. The driver and passenger died in the crash and subsequent fire. The battery pack reignited twice, requiring fire fighters to extinguish the burning battery pack three times. In reaction to this accident, Tesla sent an over-the-air firmware update that allows limiting the top speed to between 50 and 90 mph dedicated to the deceased driver.

On May 10, 2018, a Tesla S caught fire after hitting the guard-rail on the Swiss A2 highway on Monte Ceneri, between Lugano and Bellinzona, killing the 48-year-old German driver.

On June 16, 2018, pedestrians on a Los Angeles street alerted a driver of a Tesla Model S that smoke was emanating from his vehicle. The driver pulled over and safely exited the vehicle and flames started shooting out from under it. Firefighters quickly extinguished the fire, which left the cabin unaffected. The National Transportation Safety Board subsequently stated that they would monitor Tesla's investigation of the fire to learn more about fires in battery-powered vehicles, while the NHTSA stated that it collects information regarding the incident and would take action as warranted.

On February 8, 2019, A Tesla Model S caught on fire in a private garage in Pittsburgh. Two months later, on April 8, it caught on fire again, while it was under investigation. On February 24, 2019, a Tesla Model S that crashed into a tree burst into flames and burned its driver beyond recognition Sunday evening along Flamingo Road in Davie Florida, then repeatedly caught fire after being brought to the tow yard used by police. Also on February 24, 2019, a Tesla Model X was consumed by fire in the middle of frozen Lake Champlain. More than two years later, the investigation concluded that the car had been set on fire and the owner was charged with federal fraud. On April 21, 2019, a Tesla Model S was exploded in an underground garage in Shanghai, China. Five cars were damaged by the fire.

On May 4, 2019, Tesla Model S, not plugged in, with smoke observed near the rear right tire.
 Then, on May 13, 2019, a Tesla Model S, caught on fire while parked in Hong Kong. On June 1, 2019, a Tesla Model S burned down while supercharging in Belgium. On August 10, 2019, a Tesla Model 3 collided with a truck on a high-speed road in Moscow, Russia, and subsequently burned down. On November 12, 2019, a Tesla Model X from 2017 burst into flames while charging, leaving the vehicle completely destroyed in Chester, England.

On January 19, 2021, a Tesla Model 3 exploded in an underground residential parking garage in Shanghai on Tuesday, Chinese media reported. In July 2021, one of the first 250 issued Model S Plaids spontaneously burst into fire as its owner was driving it. In September 2021 alone, there were five fire related incidents involving Tesla's. On February 22, 2022, State Farm sued Tesla after another home was destroyed by fire.

On April 10, 2022, in Nashua, New Hampshire, a brand new Tesla Model S lost control and struck a tree at high speed, igniting the battery pack. Nashua Fire said, in a social media post, "These electric vehicle fires pose some unique challenges and fire crews were on scene for an extended time to complete extinguishment." Six days later, it rekindled at a tow yard. According to Deputy Chief Kevin Kerrigan, crews knocked down the flames enough to get close to the vehicle and, using equipment, rolled the vehicle over to access the battery compartment under the car. The bottom of the vehicle had a protection plate over the batteries and firefighters worked to remove it while the vehicle continued to burn. Once the plate was removed, crews continued to use water and specially rated extinguishers. No one was injured in the incident, and the vehicle will continue to be monitored for rekindling.

On July 22, 2022, Jimmy Lin was driving a Tesla Model X in Taoyuan, Taiwan, and crashed into a traffic island, then the car caught fire.

Tesla Model S and X NHTSA Probe (2019) 
Related to several reported fires, the National Highway Traffic Safety Administration (NHTSA) opened a probe (Defect Petition DP19-005) on October 24, 2019, into all Tesla Model S and X cars manufactured between 2012 and 2019. The defect alleged by the probe regards "High voltage battery fires that are not related to collision or impact damage to the battery pack". It requests a wide range of information regarding details on the engineering and production of the specified vehicles as well as any software updates since January 1, 2017 which affect the "charging rate, charging capacity, and thermal management during or after charging."

Nissan Leaf 
On September 1, 2015, a Nissan Leaf caught fire and was destroyed on a road in Flower Mound, Texas without causing injuries. The cause of the fire was not confirmed.

On October 16, 2020, a Nissan Leaf and a residential house burned down in the village of Sychavka in Lyman Raion, Odessa Oblast, Ukraine. It is unclear whether the fire started in the house or in the car. A resident of the house died in the fire.

On November 3, 2020, a Nissan Leaf caught fire in Chornomorsk near Odessa, Ukraine, leaving the car completely destroyed. The police suspected arson.

On July 8, 2021, a Nissan Leaf caught fire in Khmelnytskyi, Ukraine, while charging at a public charing station outside a shopping centre.

On August 28, 2021, a Nissan Leaf caught fire while parked outside in Saga, Japan. According to the owner, the car had been left outside after heavy rainfall in the area and suddenly caught fire two weeks later.

On September 14, 2021, a Nissan Leaf caught fire in Komsomolsk-on-Amur, Russia, probably while charging via an extension cord.

Also on September 14, 2021, a 2017 Nissan Leaf caught fire in Kremenchuk, Ukraine, the cause being unknown.

VW ID.3 
On August 14, 2021, a VW ID.3 caught fire in Groningen, Netherlands. The driver had just put her child in the car when the car began to smoke. She managed to save her child and stepped away from the vehicle. According to witnesses, at least five loud blasts were heard, after each of which the fire seemed to intensify.

On August 23, 2021, a VW ID.3 caught fire while travelling in Kellmünz, Germany. According to the driver, the car displayed several error messages, and suddenly he noticed smoke. The car was submerged in water by the firefighters.

On September 14, 2021, a VW ID.3 caught fire while travelling near the Lunner Tunnel in Lunner municipality, Norway. The driver, who noticed the smoke while driving, was not injured.

On October 27, 2021, a VW ID.3 caught fire in a parking lot in Brühl, Germany.

VW ID.4 
On November 21, 2021, a VW ID.4 caught fire while charging in a parking garage in Ravensburg, Germany.

VW e-Golf 
On December 7, 2017, a VW e-Golf caught fire in Triangel, Germany. Responding for the first time to a high-voltage battery electric vehicle fire, the firefighters first cooled the vehicle then moved it into a container which they then filled with water.

On September 3, 2021, a VW e-Golf caught fire in Dumbrăviţa, Romania. The firefighters used a container to submerge the car in water.

Porsche Panamera E-Hybrid 
On March 16, 2018, a Panamera E-Hybrid that was plugged into a household outlet for charging in Thailand burst into flames.

On May 1, 2019, a Panamera E-Hybrid caught fire after colliding violently against a Pillar of a bridge in Leça, Matosinhos, Portugal it carried 6 people, 2 died in the fire, another 2 died of injuries in the Hospital "including the driver" 2 others survived

Porsche Taycan 
On February 16, 2020, a Porsche Taycan burned while parked in a residential garage in Florida, after which Porsche started investigating the incident.

On April 2, 2021, a Porsche Taycan caught fire while charging in Skjeberg, Norway.

On October 12, 2021, a new Porsche Taycan caught fire in Red Hill, Victoria, Australia. The vehicle had just been driven into a local estate, when smoke began coming out from under the bonnet. As the fire shut down the 12-volt electrical system, the firefighters were unable to open the bonnet to get at the lithium battery. Reputedly, the Porsche Taycan Cross Turismo was the only car of its kind in Australia.

Porsche battery prototype 
On 17 August 2021, a battery prototype for electric cars caught fire at the Porsche Engineering site in Bietigheim-Bissingen, Germany.

Hyundai Ioniq 
On June 11, 2021, a fully electric Hyundai Ioniq caught fire in Sehnde-Müllingen, Germany.

On November 13, 2021, a fully electric Hyundai Ioniq caught fire in Haßfurt, Germany.  According to local police, the fire was caused either by a technical issue or arson.

Hyundai Kona Electric 

The first reported Hyundai Kona fire took place in Hyundai's Ulsan production plant in May 2018.

A second fire also occurred on the Ulsan production line on August 16, 2018.

On July 26, 2019, a Kona Electric was parked in a residential garage in Montreal, Canada. The owner reported that the car was not plugged in at the time.  An unprovoked fire began, and this triggered an explosion that projected the garage door across the street and caused damage to the attached structure. There were no injuries.

Another Kona Electric caught fire while charging in Gangneung, Gangwon Province, South Korea on July 28, 2019.

A fire in a Kona Electric occurred in Bucheon, Gyeonggi Province, South Korea on August 9, 2019. The flames began at the floor of the rear seat of the vehicle, which was parked at the time.

On August 13, 2019, a Kona Electric caught fire while being charged in an underground parking level at an apartment in Sejong City, South Korea.  The vehicle was completely destroyed.

On September 17, 2019, in Leonstein, Austria a battery fire reportedly occurred while driving.

On April 2, 2020, a Kona EV fire occurred in Gyeonggi Ansan South Korea while parked after a full charge.

On May 29, 2020, a Kona EV which after full charge at the electric charging station in Sangyeok-dong, Buk-gu, Daegu, Korea caught on fire. The fire went out in two hours, but the vehicle was completely burned, causing 29 million won of property damage.

On August 7, 2020, another Kona EV fire occurred in Buk-gu, Daegu City South Korea while charging.

On August 24, 2020, Kona EV fire occurred in Jeongeup, Jeonbuk South Korea while parked after a full charge.

Kona EV caught fire in Jeju Island, South Korea on Sept. 26, 2020. The vehicle was parked, connected to an EV charger inside the parking lot of an apartment building.

On October 4, 2020, a Hyundai Kona electric vehicle (EV) burst into flames in the early hours of Sunday morning while parked in the underground parking lot of an apartment in Daegu, South Korea.

The 14th Kona electric vehicle fire accident occurred at 3:41 am on October 17, 2020, at the electric vehicle rapid charging site at the Wabu-eup Community Service Center, Namyang-si, Gyeonggi-do, South Korea.

On October 18, 2020, Hyundai Motor, citing an investigation by Korea's transport ministry acknowledged a battery issue that led to a worldwide recall of 77,000 Kona EVs.

On January 23, 2021, The fire mysteriously broke out at a Kona Electric being charged at a taxi company in Yucheon-dong, Dalseo-gu, Daegu at 4:11 p.m. on Jan. 23. The battery underneath the vehicle was identified as the ignition point.

A fire broke out in a Kona EV parked in a pension near a beach in Boryeong, Chungcheongnam-do South Korea on the 18th of June 2021.

Emergency services in Oslo, Norway were called out to Båhusveien on Sinsen on June 16, 2021, to extinguish a Kona EV fire

On July 1, 2021, a Hyundai Kona Electric caught fire in an underground parking lot in Saesam Village 3, Boram-dong, Sejong-si, South Korea

On July 4, 2021, another Hyundai Kona Electric caught fire in Oslo, Norway.

On July 12, 2021, a Hyundai Kona Electric caught fire in an accident in Alver, Norway.

On July 30, 2021, a Hyundai Kona Electric caught fire in Rhaudermoor, Germany.

On August 31, 2022, A Kona caught fire while it was parked in an underground parking lot in Quebec City, Canada

Audi E-Tron 
On January 20, an Audi E-Tron Sportback caught fire near a car dealership in Munich, Germany, causing nearby windows to burst.

On February 16, 2021, an Audi E-Tron caught fire near Skaret, Norway. The fire was likely caused by an electric drill, not the car itself.

Audi E-Tron GT 
On 30 July 2021, an Audi E-Tron GT caught fire while charging at a public charging station in Munich, Germany. Both the car and the charging station was destroyed in the fire.

BMW i3 
On November 11, 2020, a BMW i3 caught fire in Vorendaal, Netherlands, while connected to a charging station.

On April 22, 2021, the mayor's BMW i3 caught fire in Alpen, Germany.

On April 27, 2021, a BMW i3 caught fire in a private garage in Schorndorf, Germany.

On May 3, 2021, a BMW i3-REx caught fire while travelling between Picton and Nelson in New Zealand. The fire was preceded by a warning on the car's dashboard "can't continue journey, please contact dealership immediately". After pulling over at the first safe location, flames were seen licking from under the rear wheel arch. The occupants were able to exit the vehicle without harm, and remove most of their luggage before the fire intensified. The vehicle was completely destroyed. The cause of the fire is unknown.

On July 6, 2021, a BMW i3 suddenly caught fire while travelling in Warsaw, Poland. The driver managed to escape the vehicle.

On August 28, 2021, a BMW i3 burned out in Berlin-Halensee, Germany. The fire was likely caused by arson.

On August 30, 2021, an electric BMW prototype caught fire while parked within the BMW premises in Eching, Germany. Once extinguished by the firefighters, the car reignited and had to be submerged in water. The exact cause is unknown.

On October 7, 2021, a BMW i3 caught fire in a parking lot in Chester, United Kingdom.

BMW i8 
On March 25, 2019. According to the fire department in Tilburg, the Netherlands, the BMW i8 began to smoke while in the car dealership. The staff called the fire service. The BMW i8 was put in a water tank, which may also contain other substances, in order to prevent the vehicle battery from exploding. (Tilburg, the Netherlands)

Renault Zoe 
On October 4, 2020, a Renault Zoe caught fire in Karmøy, Norway. Local residents were evacuated from a nearby building as a precaution.

On December 15, 2020, a Renault Zoe caught fire while parked in the Bjørndal suburb of Oslo, Norway.

On December 30, 2020, a 2017 Renault Zoe caught fire in a parking garage in Sandvika, Norway.

On January 3, 2021, a Renault Zoe caught fire while connected to a charging station in Illingen-Hüttigweiler, Germany. Parked next to the Zoe was another electric car, a Škoda Citigo e-iV, that also caught fire.

On January 25, 2021, a Renault Zoe caught fire while travelling in Quimperlé, France. The driver and his daughter managed to exit the car without any injuries.

On January 29, 2021, a Renault Zoe caught fire while charging at a public charging station in Teterow, Germany. The police suspected the cause to be arson.

On February 16, 2021, a Renault Zoe caught fire while parked (and possibly charging) in Bamberg, Germany.

On February 17, 2021, a Renault Zoe caught fire in the Amberg Tunnel near Feldkirch, Austria. The driver managed to exit the tunnel through the north entrance and stopped on the shoulder, where the firefighters subsequently extinguished the fire.

On May 31, 2021, a Renault Zoe caught fire in a private parking lot in Mulhouse, France.

On June 13, 2021, a Renault Zoe suddenly burst into flames while on the read near Villeneuve-lès-Béziers, France, injuring both occupants, one of whom suffered severe burns.

On July 20, 2021, a Renault Zoe caught fire while charging at a public charging station in Stadskanaal, Netherlands.

On August 14, 2021, a Renault Zoe caught fire in Stolberg, Germany.

On November 11, 2021, a Renault Zoe caught fire in Vennesla, Norway. The driver had to rescue her baby from the burning car.

Peugeot e-208 
On September 8, 2021, a Peugeot e-208 caught fire while charging in Oslo, Norway. Because of the potentially toxic smoke, local residents were asked to keep their windows shut until the fire was completely extinguished.

On the morning of December 19, 2022, a Peugeot e-208 GT caught fire while parked on a suburban street in Wellington, New Zealand. The fire engulfed the front of the vehicle, destroying everything forward of the firewall. The traction battery was not affected, however, the possibility of the 12v battery in the front being involved has not been ruled out. A fire risk recall concerning this front battery was issued internationally in 2020. It said, that “due to an error in the manufacturing process, a short circuit may occur in the battery located under the front bonnet.”

Peugeot Partner 
On October 21, 2021, two fully electric Peugeot Partners caught fire in Trondheim, Norway.

On November 15, 2021, a fully electric Peugeot Partner caught fire in Sortland, Norway. According to the occupants, they noticed the flames while looking for a parking spot and then quickly exited the van.

Fiat 500e 
On September 21, 2021, a Fiat 500e crashed into a tree near Schmogrow-Fehrow, Germany, and caught fire. The driver was injured and taken to hospital.

Roewe i6 
On September 17, 2021, a SAIC Roewe i6 Max crashed into a newspaper stand in Huizhou, China, and caught fire, leaving six people dead and another 13 injured.

Jaguar I-Pace 
On September 11, 2020, a Jaguar I-Pace crashed into a tree and caught fire in Oslo, Norway.

On August 23, 2021, a Jaguar I-Pace caught fire while parked near Redmond, Oregon, USA. The battery melted and it took around two hours to put out the fire.

On October 25, 2021, a Jaguar I-Pace caught fire while charging in Székesfehérvár, Hungary. The fire reignited several times.

NIO EC6 
On July 30, 2021, an electric NIO EC6 crashed into a guardrail in Shanghai, China, and caught fire. The driver died in the accident.

NIO ES8 
On April 22, 2019, an electric NIO ES8 caught fire at a NIO service center in Xi'an, Shaanxi Province, China. According to the investigation report, the short circuit of battery was caused by the chassis deformed after the collision of the car.

On May 16, 2019, a NIO ES8 caught fire in Anting, Jiading District, Shanghai, China.

Rimac Concept One 

On June 10, 2017, during the filming of Series 2 for The Grand Tour, journalist and presenter Richard Hammond crashed a Rimac Concept One after crossing the finish line during his last run of a timed hill climb course during the Bergrennen Hemberg event. As he did so, the car ran off the road, 110 meters (360 ft) down a hill. It landed upside down, and the car subsequently caught fire. It continued to spontaneously do so for five days afterwards. Hammond survived with just a broken leg.

BMW i4 and iX 
In August 2022, BMW recalled the BMW i4 and BMW iX models due to a risk of catching fire due to a battery issue. In June 2022, BMW was aware of incidents of a iX xDrive50 catching fire in the United States and a iX M60 catching fire outside of the United States.

StreetScooter 
On July 29, 2021, a StreetScooter caught fire in a workshop in Trier, Germany, due to a fault in the battery. As a result, the workshop building was so unstable it had to be demolished.

Electric ships

The Norwegian ferry MF Ytterøyningen operated by Norled was delivered in 2006 and is equipped with a Corvus Orca Energy storage system (ESS) with 1989 kWh capacity. A small fire was reported on October 10, 2019, in the battery room. The ferry returned to harbor under its own power where passengers and crew were evacuated to land. Overnight, however, a serious gas explosion rocked the battery room causing significant damage. Norwegian authorities have issued a statement and hazard warning.

Norwegian broadcasting company NRK reported that twelve firefighters were taken to hospital for exposure to hazardous gases associated with the batteries.

Electric bus fires

Electric buses have caught fire in France and Stuttgart, Germany.

Okinawa electric scooter
Okinawa electric scooter catches fire in Chennai, first such incident after recall notice. While riding, owner noticed smoke coming out from e-scooter
The electric scooter got totally damaged due to the fire.

Hybrid  car  fires
https://www.enjuris.com/blog/news/hybrid-vehicle-recalls-injuries/

Toyota Prius Fire
https://www.independent.com/2022/11/29/hybrid-vehicle-fire-totals-two-cars-in-los-alamos/

Bans

E-bikes are banned in many buildings in New York City because of the fire hazard.

E-scooters and e-unicycles are banned from the Transport for London network.

See also
 Boeing 787 Dreamliner battery problems  (related to lithium-ion batteries)
 Lithium-ion batteries and safety
 UPS Airlines Flight 6, a crash caused by the thermal runaway of its lithium-ion battery cargo
 Vehicle fire

References

External links
NHTSA Interim Safety Guidance for Vehicle Owner/General Public 
NHTSA Interim Safety Guidance for Law Enforcement/Emergency Medical Services/Fire Department 
NFPA Chevrolet Volt Emergency Response Guide
 Should Battery Fires Drive Electric Cars Off the Road?, Scientific American, 12 November 2013.

Videos
 Tesla Model S EV Safety Training for Emergency Responders, YouTube. Production: Ron Moore and Brock Archer, with collaboration of Tesla Motors, October 2013.

Battery electric vehicles
Electric vehicle industry
Lithium-ion batteries
Plug-in hybrid vehicles
Accidents